Otar Bestaev (born 28 October 1991) is a Russian-Kyrgyzstani judoka. He competed at the 2016 Summer Olympics in Rio de Janeiro, in the men's 60 kg, but lost in the second bout.

References

External links

 
 

1991 births
Living people
Sportspeople from Vladikavkaz
Russian male judoka
Kyrgyzstani male judoka
Olympic judoka of Kyrgyzstan
Judoka at the 2016 Summer Olympics
Judoka at the 2018 Asian Games
Asian Games competitors for Kyrgyzstan
Russian emigrants to Kyrgyzstan
Kyrgyzstani people of Russian descent